This discography is an overview of the musical works of the German rapper Samy Deluxe, as well as his pseudonyms Samsemilia, Wickeda MC, The Big Baus of the Nauf and Mr. Sorge. He was the owner of the label "Deluxe Records" and is one of the most commercially successful German rapper with over one million records sold.

Albums

Studio albums

Live albums

Mixtapes / EPs

Singles

Other singles 
 2001: Internetional Love
 2001: Sell Out Samy
 2009: Superheld
 2011: Hände hoch
 2011: Eines Tages
 2012: Zukunft Vorbye
 2013: Amnesie International
 2013: Du & Ich
 2013: Herz gebrochen (Scherben)
 2013: Finderlohn
 2013: Perlen vor die Säue
 2014: Traum
 2017: Allein in der Überzahl

References 

Hamburg hip hop
Deluxe, Samy